Hoshiarpur is a city and a municipal corporation in Hoshiarpur district in the Doaba region of the Indian state of Punjab. It was founded, according to tradition, during the early part of the fourteenth century. In 1809, it was occupied by the forces of Maharaja Karanvir Singh and was united into the greater state of Punjab in 1849.

Hoshiarpur district is located in the north-east part of the Indian state of Punjab. It falls in the Jalandhar Revenue Division and is situated in the Bist Doab portion of the Doaba region. Hoshiarpur shares a boundary with Kangra district, and Una district of Himachal Pradesh in the northeast. In the southwest, it borders Shahid Bhagat Singh Nagar district, Jalandhar district, and Kapurthala district, and in the northwest it borders Gurdaspur district.

Demographics

As per provisional data of 2011 census, Hoshiarpur City had a population of 1,68,843  out of which 88,290 were males and 80,153 were females. The literacy rate was 89.11 per cent.

 India census, Hoshiarpur had a population of 189,371. Males constitute 50.9% of the population and females 49.1%. Hoshiarpur has an average literacy rate of 85.40%, compared to 81.00% of 2001. Male literacy is 89.90%, and female literacy is 80.80%. In Hoshiarpur, 10% of the population is under 11 years of age.
 Females per 1,000 males: 962
 Density of population ( per km2.): 396
 Percentage increase in population (2001–2011): 7.1%
 Child sex ratio (0–6 Age): 859

The Scheduled Caste population in this district is 34.3%

History
The archaeological explorations during the recent years have revealed the antiquity of the Hoshiarpur District to the Harappan Period. On the basis of surface exploration, the following new sited have been brought on the Archaeological map of India and the traces of the selfsame people as at Harappa and Mohenjadaro have also been detected in the Hoshiarpur District.

Transport

Road

Hoshiarpur's Bus Stand is Bhagwan Valmiki Interstate Bus Terminal, which has a large network of bus services of Punjab Roadways, Himachal Roadways, Delhi, Haryana Roadways, P.R.T.C, Chandigarh Transport Undertaking, Jammu & Kashmir Roadways, Rajasthan State Roadways, apart from private operators.

Rail
Hoshiarpur railway station is a main railway station serving Hoshiarpur. Its code is HSX. It serves Hoshiarpur city. The station consists of one platform. The platform is not well sheltered. The station was constructed in 1905.The station has direct railway connectivity to Delhi, Amritsar, Jalandhar and Ferozpur.

Air
Adampur Airport, is a regional airport which serves one daily flight by Spicejet to Delhi Airport and another spicejet flight to Mumbai (Frequency varies). The nearest full fledge International Airport is Sri Guru Ram Dass Jee International Airport in Amritsar, which is situated around 125 km North-West of Hoshiarpur.

Education

Universities

 Guru Ravidas Ayurved University, Hoshiarpur
 Panjab University Swami Sarvanand Giri Regional Centre

Notable people
This list only includes notable people from Hoshiarpur City, for those born in Hoshiarpur district see that article.

Politics

 Sunil Arora, 23rd Chief Election Commissioner of India
 Varinder Singh Bajwa, former Member of Parliament (Rajya sabha)
 Jagjit Singh Chohan, founder of Khalsa Raj Party
 Santosh Chowdhary, ex-MP Congress
 Mayawati, M.P. elected unconrested from Hoshiarpur  1989 Indian general election
 Mangu Ram Mugowalia, prominent Ghadar Party leader and Freedom Fighter
 Avinash Rai Khanna, a Bharatiya Janata Party leader 
 Kanshi Ram, founder of Bahujan Samaj Party won election from hoshiarpur in 1996 Indian general election
 Vijay Sampla, (Minister of State for Social Justice and Empowerment) MP for Hoshiarpur is from Jalandhar. (born at Sofi Village, Jalandhar district)
 Harnam Singh Saini, an Indian revolutionary
 Manmohan Singh, (Former Prime Minister of India) studied Economics and got his bachelor's and master's degrees in 1952 and 1954 from Hoshiarpur city.
 Zail Singh, elected from Hoshiarpur in 1980 then became Union Home Minister and in 1982 the President of India

Business

 Lakshman Das Mittal Chairman Sonalika Group of industries.

Arts and culture

 Intikhab Alam, cricketer.
 Monica Bedi, a Punjabi actress is from village Chabbewal 
 Kulwinder Dhillon, singer from Mahilpur
 Harbanse Singh Doman, belongs to  Hoshirarpur
 Harp Farmer, an actor, director, producer, photographer was born in Hoshiarpur
 Piara Singh Gill, nuclear physicist 
 Shehnaaz Gill, actress and singer born in Hoshiarpur
 Sahir Hoshiarpuri, Urdu poet from India
 Habib Jalib, Pakistani revolutionary poet and left wing politician born on 24 March 1928 in a village near Hoshiarpur.
 Hard Kaur, Indian rapper
 Gauri Khan, (born Gauri Chhibber) belongs to Hoshiarpur and raised up in Delhi.
 Amanat Ali Khan, Pakistani Classic and Ghazal Singer was born in Hoshiarpur
 Munir Niazi, (1928–2006) was an Urdu and Punjabi poet born in Khanpur, a village near Hoshiarpur
 Amar Singh Shaunki, Dhadi singer
 D. P. Singh, a science populariser and environmental activist of Punjab.
 Ganda Singh, a Punjabi historian
 Mickey Singh, singer, songwriter, producer, dancer, model and actor.
 Sahib Singh, one of the Panj Pyare
 Yo Yo Honey Singh, Punjabi Rapper from Delhi was born in Hoshiarpur.

Army 

Fazal Din, of 7th Battalion 10th Baluch Regiment, British Indian Army, recipient of Victoria Cross.
Tufail Mohammad, of Punjab Regiment (Pakistan), recipient of Nishan-e-Haider

References

External links
 District web site
 Municipal Corporation, Hoshiarpur

 
Cities and towns in Hoshiarpur district